Hum Tum Dushman Dushman is an Indian war drama film written and directed by Iqbal Durrani. The movie features Mashaal Durrani, Sohini Paul, and Mukesh Rishi in the lead roles. The film was released on 6 February 2015.

Plot
An Indian soldier gets stuck in no man's land along with his Pakistani counterpart. They disregard their differences as they join forces to save the life of a Kashmiri boy who steps onto a mine.

Cast
 Mashaal Durrani  as Akbar Khan
 Sohini Paul as Barkha
 Mukesh Rishi as Anil Gujjar
 Master Dhruv Sharma as Young Boy
 Shahbaz Khan
  Parikshit Sahni
 Mushtaq Khan

Music 
The music directors of the film are Ally Ghany, Sahil Rayyan, and Babajani. The lyrics were composed by Iqbal Durrani.

References

External links 
 
 
 

2015 films
Indian action drama films
Indian war drama films
2010s Hindi-language films
Indian Army in films
2015 war drama films
2015 action drama films